St. Paul's United Methodist Church  is a congregation of the United Methodist Church, founded in 1906 and located in Houston, Texas, in the city's Museum District. St. Paul's is known for its traditional style of worship as embodied by its renowned choir. The church has as its vision statement: "To be a cathedral for the city of Houston, embodying its diversity, inspiring faith, and leading change for the common good of all peoples and communities."

History
At the beginning of the 20th century, members of Houston’s Methodist community worked toward organizing a new congregation on what was then the burgeoning south end of town. In December 1905, individuals met at the J.O. Ross family home and held Christmas Eve services at the city auditorium. The congregation officially organized on January 14, 1906, with 153 charter members. Bishop Joseph Key preached the first sermon and suggested the congregation adopt St. Paul’s as its name. The Ross family gave lots at the corner of Milam and McGowen streets for a new building. The church building was designed by R.D. Steele and consecrated in January 1909. The structure reflected a Grecian design with a dome reminiscent of Byzantine architecture.

The church grew along with the city of Houston, and in the late 1920s, members launched a campaign to raise money for new and larger facilities. Jesse H. Jones, Walter Fondren Sr., and James Marion West Sr. each contributed $150,000, and the church hired noted architect Alfred C. Finn to design a new building at the corner of Main and Binz streets. The Neo-Gothic styling features a cruciform plan on a steel-frame structure with limestone cladding. Stained glass windows are from the original structure, and the tower houses bells also brought from the church’s original sanctuary. It has been described as "one of Houston's grandest houses of worship."

In the 1950s the church started a Mothers Day Out program serving very young children up to age 3. In 1973 St. Paul's Preschool was launched, serving 3 and 4 year olds, and a kindergarten program was added in 1982. St. Paul's Preschool is accredited by the National Association for the Education of Young Children (NAEYC).

The Bankston Green, dedicated in September 2014 in honor of retired pastor Jim Bankston and his wife Sandy, is a new plaza on church property adjoining the city's Museum Walk. It includes wider sidewalks, green areas, enhanced seating and lighting, and a pavement labyrinth. The project has been given the Landmark Award by the Mayor’s Proud Partners program of Keep Houston Beautiful.

Programs
St. Paul's is known for a strong emphasis on social justice issues and radical hospitality.  For example, an advocacy group called Texas Health Care For All advocates for the creation of a single payer health care system in the United States. The Rev. Dr. Jim Bankston, who served as pastor from 1995 until his retirement in June 2013, was an outspoken advocate for immigration reform and a leader in the Breaking the Silence movement to welcome all people into the church and to ordain members of the gay, lesbian, bisexual and transgender (LGBTQ+) communities.

Clergy
The current senior minister of St. Paul's is Rev. Dr. Jeff McDonald.

References

External links
 Official webpage
 An American Cathedral: A Centennial History of St. Paul's United Methodist Church, by John Eugene Fellers and Josephine Crain (2005).

Churches in Houston
United Methodist churches in Texas
Alfred C. Finn buildings
Christian organizations established in 1906
1906 establishments in Texas
Gothic Revival church buildings in Texas